"Christian" is a song by China Crisis. It was released as a single from their 1982 debut album Difficult Shapes & Passive Rhythms, Some People Think It's Fun to Entertain and was the band's first major success on the UK Singles Chart, peaking at number 12 in February 1983.

The track features an unusual sliding bass line, and although played live by the band bassist Gary Johnson on many occasions, the bass in the original recording was played on a fretless bass by Landscape bassist Andy Pask, who also co-wrote the theme from The Bill.

The lyrics of the song was inspired by images from World War I that singer and keyboardist Gary Daly had seen, while the title Christian was added when recording the song:

Track listing

7": Virgin / VS 562 (UK) 
Side one
"Christian" - 4.10
Side two
"Greenacre Bay" - 3.51
"Performing Seals" - 2.45

12": Virgin / VS 562-12 (UK) 
Side one
"Christian" - 5.55
Side two
"Greenacre Bay" - 4.17
"Performing Seals" - 2.45

References

1983 singles
1982 songs
China Crisis songs
Virgin Records singles